Les Quinze joies de mariage (The 15 Joys of Marriage) is an anonymous late 14th or early 15th century French satire in prose which presents a picture, full of sharpness and humour, of the rows and deceits which afflict the married state. The misogynist satire is allied to a pitiless analysis  of the blindness of husbands in everyday, concrete situations.

The author remains anonymous in spite of the eight lines of octosyllables placed at the end of the text and which contain the name of the author. The riddle has held its secret up to this time but several names have been proposed: most often Antoine de la Sale, but also Jean Wauquelin and Simon de Herdin and others.

14th-century books
15th-century books
Medieval French literature
Satirical books